Life Family established on the west side of Austin, TX.  The church was started in 2005 by pastor Randy Phillips. newspaper=Austin American-Statesman|date=7 February 2005}}</ref> who is also a member of the musical group Phillips, Craig and Dean.  The church has approximately 3,500 congregants.

References

External links
 Official website

Churches in Austin, Texas